Kempf is a surname. Notable persons with that name include:

 Andreas Kempf (born 1967), German curler
 Franz Kempf (1926–2020), Australian artist
 Freddy Kempf (born 1977), British pianist residing in Berlin
 Hippolyt Kempf (born 1965), Swiss skier
 Julije Kempf (1864–1934), Croatian historian and writer
 Martine Kempf, French scientist
 Paul Kempf (1856–1920), German astronomer, astrophysician
 Roger Kempf (1927–2014), French  writer
 Starr Kempf (1917–1995), American sculptor and architect best known for his wind kinetic sculptures
 Werner Kempf (1886–1964), German World War II Panzer General
 Wilhelm Kempf (bishop) (1906–1982), German bishop of the Roman Catholic Diocese of Limburg
 Wilhelm Kempf (psychologist) (born 1947), Austrian psychologist and researcher

See also 
 Kempf (disambiguation)
 Kempff
 Kampf (surname)
 Kampf (disambiguation)

German-language surnames